Quercus pontica, the Pontine oak or Armenian oak, is a species of endangered oak currently extant to the western Caucasus mountains of Georgia and northeastern Turkey where it grows at altitudes of .

Description
Its bark is grayish to purple-brown, smooth on young trees but becoming rough later in its life. They are ovate, and have a serrated margin with numerous small, pointed teeth. The leaves are covered in hairs when they are young, but become smoother as they age. They become bright green later in life and turn yellow brown in autumn. The flowers are catkins, the male catkins 5–20 cm long. The fruit is a large acorn 2.5–4 cm long, produced in clusters of 2–5 together.

Taxonomy
The specific epithet pontica, refers to the Latin term for Pontus, a historical region near the Black Sea. Quercus pontica is placed in section Ponticae.

Cultivation
It is occasionally grown as an ornamental tree in northern Europe.

References

External links
Ornamental Plants from Russia: Quercus pontica

Other sources
Rushforth, K. D. Trees of Britain and Europe. Collins.
Coombes, A. J. Trees. Eyewitness Handbooks.

pontica
Flora of Armenia
Flora of Turkey
Garden plants of Europe
Ornamental trees
Plants described in 1849